Kim Tae-yong (born December 9, 1969) is a South Korean film director and screenwriter. After his feature directorial debut Memento Mori (1999), he helmed the critically acclaimed Family Ties (2006), and the English-language remake Late Autumn (2010).

Career 
Although he initially wanted to pursue writing, Kim Tae-yong eventually graduated from Yonsei University in 1994 with a major in Politics and Diplomacy. He first became involved in Korean cinema through a friend, who was an assistant director of an independent production. Inspired by the vibrant atmosphere that came with working on a set, Kim then enrolled at the Korean Academy of Film Arts (KAFA) in 1996. He met and became friends with fellow director Min Kyu-dong while at KAFA, where he and his classmates would work on short films as a part of the crew and doing lighting. In 1999, Kim and Min received the offer to direct Memento Mori as a sequel to the horror film Whispering Corridors (1998), and so began Kim’s foray into commercial cinema.

In some ways, Memento Mori might be considered the most influential Korean horror film of the 2000s. Although it was not a box-office hit, the film is frequently cited by young filmmakers and cinema fans as a modern-day classic. At the time of its release and in the intervening years, most critics tended to focus their attention on the other of Memento Mori'''s co-directors, Min Kyu-dong, however the release of Family Ties in spring 2006 established Kim as a highly regarded filmmaker in his own right. His intimate portrayal of a totally unconventional but non-dysfunctional family garnered multiple domestic and international awards.

Kim's third feature film Late Autumn was a remake of Lee Man-hee's 1966 classic Manchu set in Seattle. It was also critically acclaimed and became the highest-grossing Korean film in China.

Kim then joined the restoration project and re-directed Crossroads of Youth (1934) by "performing" Korea’s oldest known silent film with live narration (by the byeonsa) and musical accompaniment.

Apart from his feature films, Kim has been active in a variety of creative endeavors, from hosting a cinema-themed TV show on EBS to directing plays, shooting documentaries and making cameo appearances (both times as a film director) in the films All for Love (2005) by Min Kyu-dong and Family Matters (2006) by Nam Seon-ho.

 Personal life 
Kim married Chinese actress Tang Wei on July 12, 2014, in the front yard of the home of film legend Ingmar Bergman on the remote Swedish island of Fårö. A formal wedding ceremony was later held in Hong Kong, with only immediate family members as guests. The couple first met in 2009 when he directed her in the film Late Autumn, and began dating in October 2013 after Tang shot a commercial in Korea.

 Filmography 
Director
 Wonderland (2021)
 Picnic (short film from Mad Sad Bad, 2014)
 Have a Cup of Tea, or See a Film! (Green Film Festival in Seoul short film, 2013)
 You Are More Than Beautiful (Youku short film, 2012) 
 Late Autumn (2010)
 Take Action, Now or Never! (Green Film Festival in Seoul short film, 2009) 
 Cinema Paradise (short film, 2008)
 Girl on the Run (short film from If You Were Me 4, 2007)
 Family Ties (2006)
 On the Road, Two (rockumentary on Yoon Do Hyun Band's European tour, 2006)
 Pass Me (short film from Twentidentity, 2004)
 Memento Mori (1999)
 Pale Blue Dot (short film, 1998)
 Free to Fly (short film, 1997)

Screenplay
 Wonderland (2021)
 You Are More Than Beautiful (Youku short film, 2012)
 Late Autumn (2010) 
 Take Action, Now or Never! (Green Film Festival in Seoul short film, 2009)
 Cinema Paradise (short film, 2008)
 Family Ties (2006) 
 Memento Mori (1999) 
 Pale Blue Dot (short film, 1998)

Actor
 Family Matters (2006) cameo
 All for Love (2005) cameo
 Camellia Project: Three Queer Stories at Bogil Island (2005) cameo

Producer
 155 Mile (2007)
 Under Construction (2006)

Cinematographer
 Pale Blue Dot (short film, 1998)
 Everything I Got: Marco Polo's View (short film, 1998)

Editor
 Cinema Paradise (short film, 2008)Pale Blue Dot (short film, 1998)

Assistant directorJury (2013)

MusicPale Blue Dot (short film, 1998)

Crew memberChoked (2011)
 Wannabe (short film, 1998)

Television
 Cinema Paradiso'' (EBS, 1994) host

Theater
매혹 "Fascination" (2004) director

Awards and nominations

References

External links
Kim Tae-yong at Korean Film Biz Zone

South Korean film directors
South Korean screenwriters
Yonsei University alumni
1969 births
Living people